Amazing Atomic Activity is the eighth studio album by Polish thrash metal band Acid Drinkers. It was released on 17 May 1999. The promotional single of the album was the song "Satisfaction", which is a cover of The Rolling Stones song "(I Can't Get No) Satisfaction". It is the first album to feature rhythm guitarist Przemek "Perła" Wejmann.

The album was remastered and rereleased in 2008 with bonus tracks.

Track listing
All music and lyrics written by Acid Drinkers, except "Satisfaction" written by Mick Jagger and Keith Richards.

Bonus tracks

Personnel
Acid Drinkers
Tomek "Titus" Pukacki – vocals, bass, cover concept
Darek "Popcorn" Popowicz – lead guitar
Maciek "Ślimak" Starosta – drums, production, cover concept
Przemek "Perła" Wejmann – rhythm guitar, vocals

Production
Tommy Dziubiński – mixing, production
Grzegorz Piwkowski – mastering
Szymon Felkel – artwork
Steve Wallet – lyrics translation

References

1999 albums
Acid Drinkers albums
Metal Mind Productions albums